Senator Blatnik may refer to:

John Blatnik (1911–1991), Minnesota State Senate
Thais Blatnik (1919–2015), West Virginia State Senate